Stefan Bajic (born 11 September 1997) is an Italian-born Montenegrin footballer who plays as a right-back for  club  Grosseto. He also represented Serbia internationally before switching to Montenegro.

Club career
Bajic made his Serie C debut for Trapani on 1 December 2017 in a game against Catania.

On 3 September 2019, he joined Serie D side Fiorenzuola.

References

External links
 

Living people
1997 births
People from Fiorenzuola d'Arda
Sportspeople from the Province of Piacenza
Footballers from Emilia-Romagna
Montenegrin footballers
Association football defenders
Montenegro youth international footballers
Montenegro under-21 international footballers
Serbian footballers
Serbia youth international footballers
Italian footballers
Serbian people of Montenegrin descent
Italian people of Montenegrin descent
Italian people of Serbian descent
U.S. Cremonese players
U.S. Triestina Calcio 1918 players
Trapani Calcio players
A.S. Pro Piacenza 1919 players
U.S. Fiorenzuola 1922 S.S. players
A.C. Prato players
F.C. Grosseto S.S.D. players
Serie C players
Serie D players